{{Infobox settlement

|name = Metropolitan Borough of Bolton
|settlement_type = Metropolitan borough
|motto = "Supera Moras" <small>()</small>

|image_skyline =Bolton Town Hall.jpg
|imagesize = 250px
|image_caption = Bolton Town Hall, the seat of Bolton Council
|image_blank_emblem = Coat of arms of Bolton Metropolitan Borough Council.png
|blank_emblem_type = Coat of Arms of the Metropolitan Borough Council
|blank_emblem_size = 150px
|blank_emblem_link =
|image_map = Bolton UK locator map.svg
|map_caption = Bolton shown within Greater Manchester

|subdivision_type = Sovereign state
|subdivision_name = United Kingdom
|subdivision_type1 = Constituent country
|subdivision_name1 = England
|subdivision_type2 = Region
|subdivision_name2 = North West England
|subdivision_type3 = Ceremonial county
|subdivision_name3 = Greater Manchester
|subdivision_type5 = Historic county
|subdivision_name5 = Lancashire
|subdivision_type4 = Admin HQ
|subdivision_name4 = Bolton Town Hall

|government_footnotes =
|government_type = Metropolitan borough
|leader_title = Governing body
|leader_name = Bolton Metropolitan Borough Council
|leader_title1 = Mayor:
|leader_name1 =  Cllr. Akhtar Zaman (L)
|leader_title2 = Leadership:
|leader_name2 = Leader & Cabinet
|leader_title3 = Leader:
|leader_name3 = Martyn Cox (C)
|leader_title4 = MPs:
|leader_name4 = Mark Logan (C)Yasmin Qureshi (L)Chris Green (C)
|established_title = Founded
|established_date = 1 April 1974
|established_title2 = Borough status
|established_date2 = 1253 (Borough of Bolton)

|area_magnitude =
|unit_pref = 
|area_footnotes =
|area_total_km2 = 139.80
|area_land_km2 = 
|area_water_km2 =
|area_total_sq_mi =
|area_land_sq_mi =
|area_water_sq_mi =
|area_water_percent =
|area_urban_km2 =
|area_urban_sq_mi =
|area_metro_km2 =
|area_metro_sq_mi =
|area_blank1_title =
|area_blank1_km2 =
|area_blank1_sq_mi =

|population_as_of = 
|population_footnotes =
|population_note =
|population_total =  (Ranked )
|population_density_km2 = 1877
|population_density_sq_mi =
|population_metro =
|population_density_metro_km2 =
|population_density_metro_sq_mi =
|population_urban =
|population_density_urban_km2 =
|population_density_urban_sq_mi =
|population_blank1_title =
|population_blank1 =
|population_demonym = 

|timezone = Greenwich Mean Time
|utc_offset = +0
|timezone_DST =
|utc_offset_DST =
|coordinates = 
|elevation_footnotes = 
|elevation_m =
|elevation_ft =

|postal_code_type = Postcode areas
|postal_code = BL1-BL7, M26, M46
|area_codes = 01204, 01942, 0161
|blank_name = ISO 3166-2
|blank_info = GB-BOL
|blank1_name = ONS code
|blank1_info = 00BL (ONS)E08000001 (GSS)
|blank2_name = OS grid reference
|blank2_info = 
|blank3_name = NUTS 3
|blank3_info = UKD32
|footnotes =
|website = http://www.bolton.gov.uk
}}
The Metropolitan Borough of Bolton is a metropolitan borough in Greater Manchester, England, named after its largest town, Bolton, but covering a larger area which includes Blackrod, Farnworth, Horwich, Kearsley, 
Westhoughton, and part of the West Pennine Moors. It had a population of 276,800 at the 2011 census, making it the fourth-most populous district in Greater Manchester.

The borough is in the historic county of Lancashire, and was created in 1974 under the Local Government Act 1972, covering the area of seven former local government districts and part of an eighth; being seven urban districts from the administrative county of Lancashire, and the County Borough of Bolton. The metropolitan districts of Bury, Salford and Wigan lie to the east, south and west respectively; and the unitary authority of Blackburn with Darwen and the non-metropolitan district of Chorley in Lancashire to the north and north-west.

History
Bolton Metropolitan Borough was formed on 1 April 1974 under the Local Government Act 1972, covering the combined areas of seven former local government districts and part of an eighth, which were all abolished at the same time:
Blackrod Urban District
Bolton County Borough
Farnworth Municipal Borough
Horwich Urban District
Kearsley Urban District
Little Lever Urban District
Turton Urban District (southern part; remainder became parish of North Turton in Blackburn district.)
Westhoughton Urban District
As a county borough, the old borough of Bolton had been administratively independent from any county council, but was deemed part of Lancashire for ceremonial purposes. The other seven districts had all been part of the administrative county of Lancashire prior to 1974, with Lancashire County Council serving as their upper tier authority. When the metropolitan borough of Bolton was created in 1974 it was transferred to the new metropolitan county of Greater Manchester, with Greater Manchester Council providing county-level services. The Greater Manchester Council was abolished in 1986, after which Bolton became a unitary authority, providing all local government services.

Bolton Council unsuccessfully petitioned Elizabeth II for the Metropolitan Borough of Bolton to be granted city status in 1992 (the Queen's 40th year as monarch), in 2000 (for the Millennium celebrations), in 2002 (Queen's Golden Jubilee), and 2012 (Queen's Diamond Jubilee).

Parishes
Horwich, Westhoughton and Blackrod are now constituted as civil parishes, each having a town council: Westhoughton Town Council, Horwich Town Council and Blackrod Town Council. The rest of the metropolitan borough, covering the town of Bolton itself, Farnworth, Kearsley, Little Lever, and South Turton, have remained unparished areas since 1974.

Demographics
According to the 2021 census, of the 295,963 people living in Bolton Metropolitan Borough, the following table below show the population of ethnicities in Bolton:

 Ethnicity 

Population change
The table below details the population change since 1801, including the percentage change since the last available census data. Although the Metropolitan Borough of Bolton has only existed since 1974, figures have been generated by combining data from the towns, villages, and civil parishes that would later be constituent parts of the borough.

Religion

The following table shows the religious identity of residents residing in Bolton.

Transport
The Bolton metropolitan area is served by the following railway stations:

Bolton Trinity Street
Bromley Cross
Hall i' th' Wood
Blackrod
Horwich Parkway (for the University of Bolton Stadium – Bolton Wanderers)
Lostock
Westhoughton
Moses Gate
Farnworth
Kearsley
Daisy Hill

Education

In 2007, Bolton was ranked 69th out of the 149 Local Education Authorities – and sixth out of ten in Greater Manchester – for its National Curriculum assessment performance. Measured on the percentage of pupils attaining at least 5 A*–C grades at GCSE including maths and English, the Bolton LEA was 111th out of 149: 40.1% of pupils achieved this objective, against a national average of 46.7%. Unauthorised absence from Bolton's secondary schools in the 2006/2007 academic year was 1.4%, in line with the national average, and authorised absence was 6.0% against the national average of 6.4%. At GCSE level, Bolton School (Girls' Division) was the most successful of Bolton's 21 secondary schools, with 99% of pupils achieving at least 5 A*–C grades at including maths and English.

The University of Bolton is one of Greater Manchester's four universities. In 2008, The Times Good University Guide ranked it 111th of 113 institutions in Britain. There are 4,440 students (83% undergraduate, 17% postgraduate); 2.6% come from outside Britain.  In 2007 there were 8.8 applications for every place, and student satisfaction was recorded as 74.4%. It is one of Britain's newest universities, having been given this status in 2005.

GCSE Examination Performance 2009

 The table on the left shows the percentage of students gaining five A* to C grades, including English and Maths, for secondary schools in the Metropolitan Borough of Bolton.
 The table on the right shows the Average Total Point Score per Student for secondary schools in the Metropolitan Borough of Bolton.
 Schools highlighted in yellow are above the LEA average; those highlighted in orange are below the average. Another secondary school, Bolton Muslim Girls' School, has opened since January 2007; no results are available.''
 Source: Department for Children, Schools and Families

Governance

The local authority is Bolton Metropolitan Borough Council, which styles itself "Bolton Council". Since 2011 it has been a constituent member of the Greater Manchester Combined Authority, providing strategic co-ordination of local government across the ten metropolitan boroughs of Greater Manchester. Since 2017 the combined authority has been led by the directly-elected Mayor of Greater Manchester.

Twin towns
The Metropolitan Borough of Bolton has two twin towns, one in France and another in Germany.

Neighbouring districts

Freedom of the Borough
The following people and military units have received the Freedom of the Borough.

Individuals
 William Lever, 1st Viscount Leverhulme: 10 November 1902.
 John Pennington Thomasson: 10 November 1902.
 Andrew Carnegie: 29 September 1910.
 FM Rt Hon Lord Montgomery : 5 November 1949.
 Nat Lofthouse: 2 December 1989.
 Robert Howarth: 16 June 2001.
 Sir Jason Kenny: 16 March 2022.

Military units
 253rd Regiment Royal Artillery (TA): 18 April 1964.
 5th Battalion Loyal Regiment (North Lancashire) (TA): 18 April 1964.
 HMS Dido, RN: 14 April 1973.
 216 (The Bolton Artillery) Battery 103rd (Lancashire Artillery Volunteers) Regiment Royal Artillery: 18 May 1994.
 1st Battalion The Duke of Lancaster's Regiment: 14 March 2009.

See also
Bolton local elections
List of Mayors of Bolton
List of people from Bolton

References

External links

 
Bolton Metropolitan Borough
Metropolitan boroughs of Greater Manchester
1974 establishments in England